Rhododendron mucronatum is a rhododendron species native to China, where it grows at altitudes of . The flowers are white, pink, or pale red.

References
 "Rhododendron mucronatum", (Blume) G. Don, Gen. Hist. 3: 846. 1834.
 The Plant List
 Flora of China
 Hirsutum.com

mucronatum